Henri W.PH.E. van den Bergh van Eysinga (born Henri Wilhelm Philippus Elize van den Bergh van Eysinga on 9 August 1868 – 15 April 1920) was Dutch religious socialist. He was born in The Hague and he died in Zutphen. He was revolutionary and a philosophical writer. In his book The soul of mankind he describes how children should be raised not to harm anyone and respect life.

Notes

External links
 
 

1868 births
1920 deaths
Dutch male writers
Dutch activists
Writers from The Hague